Xu Xi (born 1954), originally named Xu Su Xi (许素细), is an English language novelist from Hong Kong.

She is also the Hong Kong regional editor of Routledge's Encyclopedia of Post-colonial Literature (second edition, 2005) and the editor or co-editor of the following anthologies of Hong Kong writing in English: Fifty-Fifty: New Hong Kong Writing (2008), City Stage: Hong Kong Playwriting in English (2005), and City Voices: Hong Kong Writing in English Prose & Poetry from 1945 to the present. Her work has also been anthologized internationally. Hong Kong magazines such as Muse run her writings from time to time and her fiction and essays have appeared recently in various literary journals such as the Kenyon Review" (Ohio), Ploughshares" (Boston), The Four Quarters Magazine (India), Ninth Letter" (Illinois), Silk Road Review" (Oregon), Toad Suck Review" (Arkansas), Writing & Pedagogy" (Sheffield, UK),Arts & Letters" (Georgia), Wasifiri (London), Cutthroat: A Journal of the Arts (Colorado), Hotel Amerika (Chicago), Upstreet (Massachusetts), and Asia Literary Review (Hong Kong).

Biography
Xu Xi is an Indonesian Chinese raised in Hong Kong. She speaks English and Chinese, even though those languages are not her parents' native languages. Her father traded manganese ore and her mother was a pharmacist. Xu started writing stories in English when she was a child. As an adult, she maintained a parallel career in international marketing for 18 years, working for several major multinationals, while writing and publishing fiction. She left corporate life in 1998.

She previously held Indonesian nationality.

Xu Xi is a graduate of the MFA Program for Poets & Writers at the University of Massachusetts Amherst. Now a U.S. citizen, she was on the low-residency MFA fiction and creative nonfiction faculty at Vermont College in Montpelier from 2002 to 2012; she was elected and served as faculty chair from 2009 to 2012.

In 2010, she became writer-in-residence at the Department of English, City University of Hong Kong, where she established and directs the first, low-residency Master of Fine Arts (MFA) programme to specialise in Asian writing in English.

In 2015, the university's decision to close the programme, at a time when freedoms in Hong Kong were felt to be under threat, drew criticism locally and from the international writing establishment.

Xu Xi is based between Hong Kong, where she works, and New York, where her life partner lives.

HonoursThe New York Times named her a pioneer English-language writer from Asia and the Voice of America featured her on their Chinese-language TV series "Cultural Odyssey."  Her novel Habit of a Foreign Sky was shortlisted for the 2007 inaugural Man Asian Literary Prize. Her short story, Famine, first published in Ploughshares, was selected for the 2006 O. Henry Prize Stories collection and she was a South China Morning Post story contest winner. She received a New York Foundation for the Arts fiction fellowship, as well as several writer-in-residence positions at Lingnan University of Hong Kong, Chateau de Lavigny in Lausanne, Switzerland, Kulturhuset USF in Bergen, Norway and The Jack Kerouac Writers in Residence Project of Orlando, Inc. In 2004, she received the distinguished alumni award from her undergraduate alma mater, SUNY-Plattsburgh and is the recipient of Ploughshares' 2005 Cohen Award. In 2009, she was the Bedell Distinguished Visiting Writer at the University of Iowa's Nonfiction Writing Program and she was the 2010 Distinguished Asian Writer at the Philippines National Writing Workshops at Silliman University, Dumaguete, Philippines.

BibliographyInsignificance: Hong Kong Stories, Signal 8 Press, 2018That Man In Our Lives, C&R Press, 2016, Access Thirteen Tales, Signal 8 Press, 2011, Habit of a Foreign Sky, Haven Books, 2010, Hong Kong Rose (1997); Asia 2000, ; Chameleon Press, 2005, Overleaf Hong Kong: stories & essays of the Chinese, Overseas, Chameleon Press, 2005, History's fiction: stories from the city of Hong Kong, Chameleon Press, 2001, 

References

External links
Xu Xi's Authors Guild site
Xu Xi at Kenyon Review
Xu Xi at Ploughshares
"Xu Xi Interview", pif magazine'', Derek Alger, May 30, 2003
C&R Press Website

1954 births
Living people
American expatriates in Hong Kong
American people of Chinese-Indonesian descent
20th-century American novelists
21st-century American novelists
American women novelists
American women short story writers
American writers of Chinese descent
Indonesian people of Chinese descent
Vermont College of Fine Arts faculty
20th-century American women writers
21st-century American women writers
20th-century American short story writers
21st-century American short story writers
University of Massachusetts Amherst MFA Program for Poets & Writers alumni
American women academics